David Langon (born January 24, 1967) is an American former weightlifter. He competed in the men's heavyweight I event at the 1992 Summer Olympics.

References

External links
 

1967 births
Living people
American male weightlifters
Olympic weightlifters of the United States
Weightlifters at the 1992 Summer Olympics
People from San Leandro, California
20th-century American people
21st-century American people